Enarre is an album by drummer Paul Murphy. It was recorded in June 2001 at Bias Studio in Virginia, and was released by Cadence Jazz Records in 2002. On the album, Murphy is joined by cellist Kash Killion and pianist Joel Futterman.

Reception

In a review for AllMusic, Glenn Astarita wrote: "the band moves forward with the power of a rumbling freight train here.... The band's synergistic approach consists of massive sheets of sound and sweeping undercurrents, as the musicians navigate a plethora of peaks, valleys, and swirling cadenzas... they spur each other through heated moments to complement a few sanguine interludes. Murphy shines radiantly thanks to his relentless attack, awash with tumbling, polyrhythmic-type fills and stinging press rolls. The group engages a modus operandi that is founded upon maddening flurries and verbose exchanges. And despite the rather serious implications, this is a fun-filled affair. Recommended."

The authors of The Penguin Guide to Jazz awarded the album 3½ stars, and commented: "The Enarre trio have worked together before and... they were clearly bursting to play: one piece, "SFERICS", passes the 30-minute mark with no apparent loss of energy or — more surprisingly — invention. Murphy can stoke up some terrific bouts of noise at the kit, although for much of the way he's happy to play more sparsely... Futterman is as fulsome as usual, but Killion is perhaps the most interesting contributor, favouring the bow over the fingers and finding a powerful middle ground between cello and bass terrain."

Track listing
All compositions by Paul Murphy.

 "D1T1" – 4:43
 "Desert Fire" – 9:40
 "Intersections" – 15:05
 "SFERICS" – 30:56
 "ZYGOUN" – 11:10

Personnel 
 Kash Killion – cello
 Joel Futterman – piano
 Paul Murphy – drums

References

2002 albums
Paul Murphy (musician) albums
Cadence Jazz Records albums
Free jazz albums